The following pairings won the U.S. Open tennis championship in mixed doubles.

Finals

U.S. National Championships

US Open

See also

U.S. Open other competitions
List of US Open men's singles champions
List of US Open men's doubles champions
List of US Open women's singles champions
List of US Open women's doubles champions

Grand Slam mixed doubles
List of Australian Open mixed doubles champions
List of French Open mixed doubles champions
List of Wimbledon mixed doubles champions 
List of Grand Slam mixed doubles champions

Notes

References

External links
 List of US Open Mixed Doubles Champions

Mix
US Open
US Open